Highway 374 is a highway in the Canadian province of Saskatchewan. It runs from Highway 21 to Highway 14 near Scott.

The highway travels east for  past the hamlet of Tramping Lake before it turns north, passing the hamlet of Scott before terminating at Highway 14.

References

374